The Prinsep Street Presbyterian Church (Chinese: 布连拾街长老会磐石堂) is located on Prinsep Street within Singapore's central business district. It is approximately 350 metres from Rochor MRT station.

The church, previously known as the Malay Mission Chapel, was founded by Rev. Benjamin Peach Keasberry in 1843. The chapel was replaced with the present Romanesque-style building in 1930. It was gazetted a national monument by Singapore's National Heritage Board on 12 January 2000.

History
In 1843, Rev. Keasberry was able to raise sufficient funds to build a small chapel on Prinsep Street for outreach to the Malay people.

By the early 20th century, the area around the church became densely populated. This led Scotsman James Milner Fraser to start the 1st Company of the Singapore Boys’ Brigade in the church. Its formation in 1930 led to a large number of young people joining the church. In 1950, the 7th Girls' Brigade Company was formed in the church, drawing the students from the Singapore Chinese Girls' School and the Convent of the Holy Infant Jesus (CHIJ) in Victoria Street.

In the 1960s, the Church operated a kindergarten in the mornings.

An outreach ministry was started in Woodlands in 1983. Then in 1984, a tuition outreach ministry began at 25 Adam Road.

In 1992, the Woodlands and Adam Road ministries merged to form the Woodlands-Adam Road Ministry. This was eventually reconstituted as Adam Road Presbyterian Church in 1997.

Prinsep Street Presbyterian Church was gazetted a national monument by the National Heritage Board of Singapore on 12 January 2000.

Architecture
The Prinsep Street Presbyterian Church was designed by architect C.J. Stephens of Swan and Maclaren. Its notable features are the deep red bricks and raised brickwork on the tower and belfry.

At the front of the church, lightly modelled brickwork rises high in gable formation expressing the shape of the roof and culminating in a bell tower, now housing a loudspeaker. The buildings within the enclosure are all rendered and painted.

Sunday Services 

The Prinsep Street Presbyterian Church conducts several multi-lingual services on Sunday. All services involve lay participation.

Apart from English and Mandarin services, the church also holds services for Filipino and Myanmar worshippers, and is one of the few churches in Singapore to hold services in the Mizo language. Presently, about 40 Mizo people, mostly foreign domestic workers, worship in a room on the upper level of the church.

See also

 Presbyterian Church in Singapore
 Singapore Life Church
 Life Bible-Presbyterian Church
 Christianity in Singapore

References

Further reading 
National Heritage Board (2002), Singapore's 100 Historic Places, Archipelago Press, 
Norman Edwards, Peter Keys (1996), Singapore - A Guide to Buildings, Streets, Places, Times Books International,

News articles

External links

Prinsep Street Presbyterian Church
The Presbyterian Church in Singapore

Presbyterian churches in Singapore
Landmarks in Singapore
National monuments of Singapore
Rochor